Robert David Downes (born 18 August 1949) is an English former footballer, coach and manager. He started his playing career as a left back, later becoming a left winger. After starting his career at West Bromwich Albion, Downes played 470 games in the Football League for Peterborough United, Rochdale, Watford, Barnsley and Blackpool. He won the Fourth Division title with Watford in 1977–78. He later worked as a coach at Blackpool, Aston Villa, Port Vale, Wolverhampton Wanderers, Watford, and Blackburn Rovers, before being appointed Head of Recruitment at Nottingham Forest in February 2013.

Playing career
Born in Bloxwich, Staffordshire, Downes started his career as an apprentice at West Brom. He turned professional in 1966, but joined Peterborough United the following year having failed to make a league appearance. After two seasons as a squad player at Peterborough, he joined newly promoted Rochdale at the end of the 1968–69 season. He was a first-team regular at Rochdale, as they managed to stay in the Football League Third Division for five consecutive seasons. Following their relegation in 1974, he transferred to Watford, for a fee of £10,000. Downes missed just three games in his debut season at Vicarage Road, but Watford were relegated to the Fourth Division at the end of 1974–75, and were unable to obtain promotion in the following two campaigns.

Mike Keen was replaced as manager by Graham Taylor in June 1977. Taylor decided that Downes, who had previously spent much of his career at left back, should play further up the field; Downes was ever-present on the left wing in the 1977–78 season, scoring 10 goals in all competitions as Watford won promotion as champions of the Fourth Division. He faced increased competition in 1978–79, but nonetheless made 46 appearances as Watford secured a second consecutive promotion, and reached the semi-finals of the League Cup. However, Downes only managed 10 Watford appearances in 1979–80, and was sold to Barnsley for £10,000 in March 1980, playing a part in Barnsley's improved form at the end of that season.

After two years at Barnsley, he joined Blackpool on a free transfer in 1982. After two years as a player-coach for the Tangerines, he retired from playing in 1984.

Coaching career
In June 1987, newly appointed Aston Villa manager Graham Taylor appointed Downes as a youth coach. He remained there until 1991, before taking up the same role at Port Vale in July that year. He was upgraded to the position of first team coach in March 1992. He was again signed by Taylor in June 1994, this time as assistant manager at Wolverhampton Wanderers. Following Taylor's dismissal in November 1995, Downes briefly served as caretaker manager. Wolves won two and drew one of Downes' six matches in charge. Taylor signed Downes for a third time in June 1996, as director of youth football at Watford.

Downes left Watford in May 1997, to take up a similar position at Premier League side Blackburn Rovers. Players to go through the academy during Downes' tenure included England international David Dunn, as well as future Watford player Martin Taylor. He left the position in July 2009, by mutual consent. Following this he took up a scouting role at Preston North End.

In February 2013, he was appointed as the Head of Recruitment at Nottingham Forest. He left the club in March 2014 and went on to scout for Preston North End, Derby County, Aston Villa and Sheffield Wednesday.

Career statistics
Source:

A.  The "Other" column constitutes appearances and goals in the League Cup, Football League Trophy, Football League play-offs and Full Members Cup.

Honours
Watford
Football League Fourth Division: 1977–78

References

1949 births
Living people
People from Bloxwich
Association football fullbacks
Association football wingers
English footballers
West Bromwich Albion F.C. players
Peterborough United F.C. players
Rochdale A.F.C. players
Watford F.C. players
Barnsley F.C. players
Blackpool F.C. players
English Football League players
English football managers
Wolverhampton Wanderers F.C. managers
English Football League managers
Association football coaches
Association football scouts
Blackpool F.C. non-playing staff
Aston Villa F.C. non-playing staff
Port Vale F.C. non-playing staff
Wolverhampton Wanderers F.C. non-playing staff
Watford F.C. non-playing staff
Blackburn Rovers F.C. non-playing staff
Preston North End F.C. non-playing staff
Nottingham Forest F.C. non-playing staff
Derby County F.C. non-playing staff
Sheffield Wednesday F.C. non-playing staff